Elton Anthony Cordle (born September 21, 1940 in Bridgetown) is a former Barbadian first-class cricketer who played in Wales for Glamorgan.

Cordle moved to the United Kingdom during the 1960s and found a job working for London Transport. He then travelled to Cardiff where his siblings were living and signed up for their local cricket club before being picked up by Glamorgan.

He made his first class debut in 1963, becoming the county's first ever overseas fast bowler and cemented his spot in the side by 1967 after managing 74 wickets at 21 during the season. He was a member of their Championship winning side in 1969 and took his career best figures that season of 9 for 49 against Leicestershire.

In 1979 Cordle was named as Glamorgan's 'Player of the Year' and from 1981 until 1983 he acted as Glamorgan coach before eventually emigrating to Canada.

References

External links
Tony Cordle at Cricinfo 
Tony Cordle at the Museum of Welsh Cricket

1940 births
Living people
Barbadian cricketers
Glamorgan cricketers
Cricketers from Bridgetown